Juno Records is a UK-based online dance music retail store, selling vinyl records, CDs, music downloads and music accessories, founded by Richard Atherton and Sharon Boyd. The website was created in 1996 as an information-only site called The Dance Music Resource Pages, listing new dance music titles each day as they were released. In 1997 the site changed into the commercial store Juno Records, allowing users to buy the records and CDs listed. During the e-commerce boom of the late 1990s, the site differentiated itself from other dance music stores by maintaining a text-based presentation.

In December 2004, version 2 of Juno Records’ web site was launched, adding graphics, and more flexible navigation to the original site design.

In February 2006, Juno Records added MP3 and WAV downloads to its catalogue, and in July 2006 launched Juno Download as a standalone site.  In the same year, the web site also won Best Entertainment site in the Website Of The Year awards. In September 2006, a Spanish-language version of the web site was added.

In 2007 a series of 10 releases were commissioned to mark Juno Records' 10th anniversary, each featuring a well-known dance track remixed by new producers, including remixes of Faze Action by Carl Craig and Cybotron’s "Clear" by Troy Pierce and Cobblestone Jazz.

In June 2007 Juno Records won DJ Magazine’s "Best Of British" award for Best British Record Store. In August 2007, a German version of Juno Records’ website was launched.

Current sites
 Juno Records – the main international online shop for both physical and digital products, with language support in English, Spanish, German, Mandarin, and Japanese
 Juno Download – international online digital download shop

References

External links

Main sites
  – official site
  – official site

Other sites
 

Retail companies established in 1996
Companies based in the London Borough of Camden
Mass media companies based in London
Online music stores of the United Kingdom